Catteville is a commune in the Manche department in Normandy in north-western France. The inhabitants are called Cattevillais.

See also
 Communes of the Manche department

References

Communes of Manche